Alipi Kostadinov (born 16 April 1955) is a retired cyclist from Czechoslovakia who specialized in road racing. He won a bronze medal in the 100 km time trial at the 1980 Summer Olympics and at the 1981 UCI Road World Championships.

He competed in several major road races between 1976 and 1983, and won one stage at the Tour of Austria in 1976 and at the race of Lidice in 1982.

References

External links
 
 

1955 births
Living people
Czechoslovak male cyclists
Olympic cyclists of Czechoslovakia
Cyclists at the 1980 Summer Olympics
Olympic medalists in cycling
Olympic bronze medalists for Czechoslovakia
Medalists at the 1980 Summer Olympics